The Bahamas President's Cup is the top knockout tournament of the Bahamas football. The cup was created in 1999.

Finals
Winners were: 
1999: Cavalier FC  
2000: Cavalier FC          2–2 Bears FC           [aet, 3–1 pen]
2001: Khaki Superstars     3–0 Cavalier FC
2008/09 Bears FC         3–0 Cavalier FC
2009/10 Bears FC      4–0 Khaki Superstars
2010/11 Cavalier FC 2–1 Bears FC

References

Football competitions in the Bahamas
National association football cups
1999 establishments in the Bahamas
Recurring sporting events established in 1999